The 1965–66 NCAA University Division men's basketball season began in December 1965, progressed through the regular season and conference tournaments, and concluded with the 1966 NCAA University Division basketball tournament championship game on March 19, 1966, at Cole Field House in College Park, Maryland. The Texas Western Miners won their first NCAA national championship with a 72–65 victory over the Kentucky Wildcats.

Season headlines 

 After introducing a preseason Top 20 the previous season, the Associated Press (AP) Poll contracted its preseason poll to a Top 10, aligning with the Top 10 format for in-season polls it had used since the 1961–62 season.
 The NCAA tournament contracted from 23 to 22 teams.
Texas Western became the first team to begin an NCAA tournament final game with an all-African American starting lineup, and the first team with an all-African American starting line-up to win the NCAA championship.
 The Metropolitan Collegiate Conference, consisting of schools in the New York City-New Jersey area, began play.

Season outlook

Pre-season polls 

The Top 10 from the AP Poll and Top 20 from the Coaches Poll during the pre-season.

Conference membership changes

Regular season

Conference winners and tournaments

Informal championships

Statistical leaders

Post-season tournaments

NCAA tournament

Final Four 

 Third place – Duke 79, Utah 77

National Invitation tournament

Semi-finals and Finals 

 Third place – Villanova 76, Army 65

Awards

Consensus All-American teams

Major player of the year awards 

 Helms Player of the Year: Cazzie Russell, Michigan
 Associated Press Player of the Year: Cazzie Russell, Michigan
 UPI Player of the Year: Cazzie Russell, Michigan
 Oscar Robertson Trophy (USBWA): Cazzie Russell, Michigan
 Sporting News Player of the Year: Cazzie Russell, Michigan

Major coach of the year awards 

 Henry Iba Award: Adolph Rupp, Kentucky
 NABC Coach of the Year: Adolph Rupp, Kentucky
 UPI Coach of the Year: Adolph Rupp, Kentucky
 Sporting News Coach of the Year: Adolph Rupp, Kentucky

Other major awards 

 Robert V. Geasey Trophy (Top player in Philadelphia Big 5): Bill Melchionni, Villanova
 NIT/Haggerty Award (Top player in New York City metro area): Albie Grant, LIU Brooklyn

Coaching changes 

A number of teams changed coaches during the season and after it ended.

References